Jens Grembowietz (born February 2, 1987) is a German footballer who plays as a defender for Hammer SpVg.

External links

1987 births
Living people
German footballers
FC Schalke 04 II players
Dynamo Dresden players
SC Preußen Münster players
KSV Hessen Kassel players
SG Wattenscheid 09 players
3. Liga players
Hammer SpVg players
Association football defenders
Footballers from Essen